The FEI World Cup Jumping 2008–09 will be the 31st edition of the premier international show jumping competition run by the FEI. The final held at the Thomas & Mack Center in Las Vegas, Nevada from April 15, 2009 to April 19, 2009. Meredith Michaels-Beerbaum of Germany was the defending champion, having won the final the previous year (2007–08) in Gothenburg, Sweden.

Arab League

Caucasian League

Central Asian League

Central European League

North Sub-League

South Sub-League

Final

Japan League

Mexican League

North American League

Canada

United States East Coast

United States West Coast

Pacific League

Australia

New Zealand

South African League

South American League

South East Asia League

Western European League

World Cup Final

References

 show jumping result search of the International Federation of Equestrian Sports

External links
Official website
Complete event schedule

2008 2009
2008 in show jumping
2009 in show jumping